The women's 500 m time trial competition at the 2006 Asian Games was held on 9 December at the Aspire Hall 1.

Schedule
All times are Arabia Standard Time (UTC+03:00)

Records

Results

References

External links 
Results

Track Women Time Trial